Great Break may refer to:

Great Break, Stalin's campaign of Soviet collectivization and industrialization
Grande Coupure, the transition between the end of the Eocene and the beginning of the Oligocene, marked by large-scale extinction and floral and faunal turnover 
Groote Braak, a 17-18th century gap in a dam around Amsterdam